The 1999 Tour de la Région Wallonne was the 26th edition of the Tour de Wallonie cycle race and was held on 30 July to 4 August 1999. The race started in Ploegsteert and finished in Amay. The race was won by Mikael Holst Kyneb.

General classification

References

Tour de Wallonie
Tour de la Région Wallonne